Cecil Gray may refer to:

 Cecil Gray (American football) (born 1968), former American football player
 Cecil Gray (composer) (1895–1951), Scottish music critic and composer
 Cecil Gray (cricketer) (1902–1990), Australian cricketer
 Cecil Gray (poet), Caribbean poet, former educator and author